Squalus clarkae, also known as Genie's dogfish, is a species of shark from the Gulf of Mexico and western Atlantic. It was described in 2018 and named in honor of ichthyologist Eugenie Clark. It was previously believed to be a part of Squalus mitsukurii, but genetic analysis revealed it to be a distinct species. This species is known to be longer in length in comparison to the Squalus Mitsukurii. Their first dorsal fin is also structured differently than the other species in the genus Squalus.

References

Squaliformes
Fish described in 2018